.vc is the Internet country code top-level domain (ccTLD) for Saint Vincent and the Grenadines. 

Registration is open worldwide, and it has been used for a variety of sites not necessarily related to that location; it can also be seen as standing for "Venture Capital", "Ventura County", "Version Control", "Video Conferencing", or other things, like an informal, but common, abbreviation of "você" (in Portuguese). In this way, ".com.vc" could be understood in Portuguese like ".with.you" would be in English. .vc is sometimes mistaken for being the ccTLD of the Vatican City State, which is .va.

On October 31, 2000, the .vc registry operations contract was awarded to Tucows by the government of St. Vincent and the Grenadines. Tucows serviced .vc through their wholly-owned subsidiary Liberty RMS. On March 25, 2002, Afilias acquired Liberty RMS from Tucows, and the binding registry operations contract for the .vc ccTLD was assigned to Afilias by Tucows. Afilias is the current .VC ccTLD registry operator. Names under the domain began to be registered by the public on July 9, 2002 and began resolving the following month.

External links
 IANA .vc information

Computer-related introductions in 1991
Country code top-level domains
Communications in Saint Vincent and the Grenadines

sv:Toppdomän#V